His Majesty's Hired armed cutter Lurcher was a 12-gun cutter that served the Royal Navy from 15 August 1795 until 15 January 1801 when a French privateer captured her in the Channel.

On 6 June 1793, the cutter Lurcher, of 100 tons burthen, eight 3 and 4-pounder guns, and under the command of Christopher Heayott, received a Letter of Marque.

Naval service
On 1 April 1798, Lurcher and the hired armed cutter Nimrod recaptured the Roebuck packet, which the French privateer Adelaide had captured on 20 March. Lurcher and Nimrod sent Roebuck into Plymouth.

In 1799, Lurcher was under the command of Lieutenant  J. Betts, and stationed at Portsmouth.

Lurcher shared, with many other British warships, in the capture of the French privateer Aimable Victoire on 29 January 1799. Aimable Victoire was armed with 16 brass 8-pounder guns and two iron 6-pounder guns, and had a crew of 86 men. She was on her first cruise, was one day out of Cherbourg, and had not captured anything.

On 19 June Lurcher, Lieutenant Robert Forbes, came into Plymouth from Brest, with damage that she had sustained in an engagement with a French cutter. Lurcher had succeeded in cutting out the French cutter from the Penmarks.

On 13 November 1800, the hired armed cutters Nile and Lurcher captured the French brig Prothée. Five days later they captured a French privateer brig of 14 guns. Prize money was due to be paid on 10 July 1801 in Plymouth.

Two weeks later, on 23 November, Captain Sir Richard Strachan in  chased a French convoy in to the Morbihan where it sheltered under the protection of shore batteries and the 20-gun corvette Réolaise.  was able to force the corvette onto the shore at Port Navalo, though she got off again. The hired armed cutters Nile and Lurcher towed in four more boats from Magicienne. Although the cutting-out party landed under heavy fire of grape and musketry, it was able to set the corvette on fire; shortly thereafter she blew up. Only one British seaman, a crewman from Suworow, was killed. However, Suworow's sails and rigging were so badly cut up that Captain had to tow her. A French report of the action stated that Captain Duclos, seeing the approach of the British, ran Réolaise on shore and burnt her.

On 7 December 1800, Nile discovered a convoy of 15 or 16 small vessels coming round the point of Croisic near the mouth of the river Vilaine in Quiberon Bay. Lurcher joined Nile and together the two cutters captured or destroyed nine vessels at a cost of only one man wounded on Lurcher, despite fire from shore batteries. The three vessels that fell to Lurcher were all sailing from Nantes to Yannes with wine from Nantes. The three vessels were:
Maria Joseph, Martin Beroist, master, of two men and eight tons. Lurcher captured her.
Eponine, Yine Le Frank, of three men and 13 tons. Lurcher drove her on shore on Houat with the loss of her cargo.
Bon Secour, Yine Nicolane, of two men and eight tons. Lurcher sank her at anchor, but after saving her cargo.

Fate
In 1801 Lurcher was still under the command of Lieutenant Forbes when a 16-gun French privateer captured her. Lurcher had been believed wrecked in a gale, but a letter from  dated 24 February at Lorient arrived at Portsmouth on 2 March. A flag of truce vessel had reported that Lurcher was at Lorient after a French privateer of superior force had captured her "after a gallant action."

Notes

Citations

References

 
 

 
  
 
 Naval Chronicle

Hired armed vessels of the Royal Navy
Captured ships
Privateer ships of the United Kingdom